Dudley Jack Glass (24 September 1899 – 29 November 1981) was an Australian-born composer, pianist and writer. He is best known for composing musicals and light operas, including The Beloved Vagabond and The Toymaker of Nuremberg.

References

Australian musical theatre composers
1899 births
1981 deaths
Australian musical theatre lyricists